Matua Banglara is a town in the Islamabad Capital Territory of Pakistan. It is located at 33° 16' 45N 73° 19' 25E with an altitude of 442 metres (1453 feet).

References 

Union councils of Islamabad Capital Territory